Belhomme is a French surname meaning "handsome man". Notable people with the surname include:

  (1814–1891), French botanist and mountain climber
  (1848–1931), French politician
  (born 1976), French writer and musician
  (1653–1727), Benedictine abbot and writer from Lorraine
 Hippolyte Belhomme, (1854–1923), French opera singer
 Jacques Belhomme (1737–1824), owner of the Pension Belhomme
 Jacques-Étienne Belhomme (1800–1880), French psychiatrist, son of Jacques Belhomme
 Jeanne Belhomme, French actress and theatre director
  (born 1978), French film director

See also
 La Bête à Maît' Belhomme, 1885 short story by Guy de Maupassant
 Pension Belhomme, prison and private clinic during the French Revolution
 Rue Belhomme, street in the 18th arrondissement of Paris

French-language surnames